Major General Fred "Doug" Robinson Jr. a native of Bolivar, Tennessee, was commissioned a second lieutenant in the United States Army from the University of Tennessee. As of 2007, he was commanding general of Army Research, Development and Engineering Command in the United States Army.

Career
His first assignment was as a cavalry platoon leader with the Second Squadron, First Cavalry Regiment of the Second Armored Division, Fort Hood, Texas.  His next assignment was as the A Troop executive officer and the support platoon leader of the squadron. Over the course of his career, his assignments have included commander, A Troop, 3rd Squadron, 7th Cavalry, 3rd Infantry Division, U.S. Army Europe; executive officer, 2nd Battalion, 69th Armor during Operations Desert Shield and Desert Storm; commander, 3rd Battalion, 64th Armor, 3rd Infantry Division, USAREUR; commander, 1st Brigade, 1st Infantry Division, Fort Riley, Kansas; deputy director for operations, National Military Command Center; commanding general, United States Army Test and Evaluation Command, Fort Hood, Texas; assistant division commander for maneuver, 1st Armored Division, director of operations, readiness and mobilization, Office of the deputy chief of staff, G3/5/7, commander, 1st Armored Division and commander, Research, Development and Engineering Command (RDECOM).

Awards and decorations
Robinson's awards and decorations include:

Parachutist Badge
Joint Chiefs of Staff Identification Badge 
Army Staff Identification Badge.
  Army Distinguished Service Medal
  Defense Superior Service Medal
  Legion of Merit with two oak leaf clusters
  Bronze Star
  Defense Meritorious Service Medal
  Meritorious Service Medal with four oak leaf clusters
  Army Commendation Medal with oak leaf cluster
  National Defense Service Medal
  Southwest Asia Service Medal
  Kuwait Liberation Medal Saudi Arabia
  Kuwait Liberation Medal Kuwait

Education
His military education includes the Armor Officer Basic and Advanced Courses; the Army Command and General Staff College, and the National War College. He has a bachelor's degree in mechanical engineering from the University of Tennessee; a master's degree in systems analysis from Memphis State University and National security and strategic studies from the National Defense University.

References

Year of birth missing (living people)
Living people
University of Tennessee alumni
University of Memphis alumni
United States Army Command and General Staff College alumni
National Defense University alumni
United States Army generals
Recipients of the Distinguished Service Medal (US Army)
Recipients of the Legion of Merit
Recipients of the Defense Superior Service Medal
Recipients of the Meritorious Service Medal (United States)